Caroline Mary Elam (born 12 March 1945) is a British art historian specializing in Florentine architecture, art and patronage in the Renaissance. She has been a senior research fellow at the Warburg Institute in the University of London since 2012.

Early life and education
Caroline Elam is the daughter of John Frederick Elam OBE and Joan Barrington Elam (née Lloyd). Her secondary education was at Colchester County High School for Girls. She then obtained a BA in classics at Lady Margaret Hall in the University of Oxford  in 1967 and an MA  in the history of art from the Courtauld Institute of Art in 1970.

Career 
Elam was appointed as a lecturer in the history of art at the University of Glasgow from 1970 to 1972. She was subsequently awarded a research fellowship at King's College, Cambridge from 1972 until 1976. She taught the history of art at Westfield College, University of London from 1976 to 1987 before serving as editor of the Burlington Magazine from 1987 until 2002; she is currently a director. In addition to publishing articles on the history of art and curating exhibitions, Elam lectures widely in universities and art galleries.  From 2002 to 2004 she was Andrew W. Mellon Professor for the History of Art at the Center for Advanced Studies for the Visual Arts in the National Gallery of Art, Washington DC. In 2004 she was appointed visiting professor at the Harvard Center for Italian Renaissance Studies at Villa I Tatti, Florence after winning the I Tatti Mongan Prize in 2003. She is currently a trustee of the Fitzwilliam Museum, Cambridge and an honorary fellow of King's College Cambridge. In 2005 she was awarded an honorary doctorate by Oxford Brookes University.

Personal life 
In 2009 Elam married the theologian, the Very Rev. John Henry Drury, Chaplain and Fellow of All Souls College, Oxford since 2003; prior to that, he had had been Dean of Christ Church, Oxford between 1991 and 2001. Until retirement, her older brother Nicholas served as a diplomat and cultural advisor, with postings in South Africa, Brussels, Bahrain, Luxemburg, Montreal, Zimbabwe and the Council of Europe; he was awarded a CMG in 1994.

Selected publications

Notes

External links
Biographical sketch, Oxford Brooks University
Biographical sketch, Harvard University
Biographical sketch, Courtauld Institute of Art
Biographical sketch, National Gallery of Art, Washington DC 
Biographical sketch, Max Planck Institute of Art History, Florence
Biographical sketch and photograph, National Portrait Gallery, London

1945 births
Living people
British art historians
Women art historians
British women historians
Alumni of Lady Margaret Hall, Oxford